Caloptilia amphidelta is a moth of the family Gracillariidae. It is known from Canada (Ontario and Québec).

References

amphidelta
Moths of North America
Moths described in 1918